In public transport, Route 9 may refer to:

Spain 

 Barcelona Metro line 9
 Line 9 (Madrid Metro)

United Kingdom 

 London Buses route 9

United States 

 9 (New York City Subway service)
 9 - Mayfield (Cleveland RTA), a bus route in Cleveland
 Route 9 (MTA Maryland), a bus route in the suburbs of Baltimore, Maryland

9